William Byrd (circa 1540–1623) was an English composer.

William Byrd may also refer to:

 William Byrd I (1652–1704), Virginia colonist
 William Byrd II (1674–1744), colonial Virginia planter, author, and founder of Richmond
 William Byrd III (1728–1777), American racehorse owner
 William Byrd (baseball player) (1907–1991), American professional baseball player
 William Byrd Traxler Jr. (born 1948), federal judge on the U.S. Court of Appeals for the Fourth Circuit
 William Byrd, African-American man who was lynched in Brentwood, Georgia on May 28, 1922

See also
 William Byrd Hotel
 William Byrd High School
 William Byrd Community House
 William Bird (disambiguation)